"Just One Kiss" is a song written by J.P. Pennington and Sonny LeMaire, and recorded by American country music group Exile.  It was released in March 1988 as the third single from their album Shelter from the Night.  The song reached No. 9 on the Billboard Hot Country Singles chart in July 1988.

Charts

Weekly charts

Year-end charts

References

1988 singles
1987 songs
Exile (American band) songs
Songs written by J.P. Pennington
Songs written by Sonny LeMaire
Epic Records singles